The East line is a planned line of the Macau Light Rapid Transit. Unlike Macau's existing LRT line, which runs on an elevated guideway, the East line is planned to run entirely underground, constructed with a tunnel-boring machine. The line will from the terminus of the Taipa line at Taipa Ferry Terminal, and traverse Zone E of the Macau New Urban Zone, stopping in the centre of the zone. It will then cross under the Praia Grande to the southern end of New Urban Zone A. The track will run under the central greenway of zone A, stopping at 3 stations there. Finally, it will run underwater, along the coast of the Macau peninsula, stopping at stations at Arena Preta and Portas do Cerco. The line will be 7.8 km long.

References

Light rail in Macau